São Vicente is a village in the Cacheu Region of north-western Guinea-Bissau. It lies on the southern bank of the Cacheu River, to the east of Jolmete.

References

Populated places in Guinea-Bissau
Cacheu Region